The Inter Baku 2016–17 season was Inter Baku's sixteenth Azerbaijan Premier League season, and their second season under manager Zaur Svanadze. They finished the season in third place, and were knocked out of the Azerbaijan Cup at the semifinal stage by Gabala.

Squad

 (captain)

Transfers

Summer

In:

Out:

Winter

In:

Out:

Friendlies

Competitions

Azerbaijan Premier League

Results summary

Results

League table

Azerbaijan Cup

Squad statistics

Appearances and goals

|-
|colspan="14"|Players who left Inter Baku during the season:

|}

Goal scorers

Disciplinary record

References

External links 
 Inter Baku at Soccerway.com

Shamakhi FK seasons
Azerbaijani football clubs 2016–17 season